Austropyrgus dyerianus is a species of minute freshwater snail with an operculum, an aquatic gastropod mollusk or micromollusk in the Hydrobiidae family. This species is endemic to Australia.

See also 
 List of non-marine molluscs of Australia

References

Further reading

External links

Hydrobiidae
Austropyrgus
Gastropods of Australia
Endemic fauna of Australia
Vulnerable fauna of Australia
Gastropods described in 1879
Taxonomy articles created by Polbot
Taxobox binomials not recognized by IUCN